Shock of Daylight is an EP by English post-punk band the Sound, released in April 1984 on Statik Records in the UK and A&M Records in the US.

The EP was seen by critics as a comeback for the band, after the band's critically and commercially disappointing previous album, 1982's All Fall Down. Two singles were released from the EP, "Counting the Days" and "Golden Soldiers" (the latter in Spain only).

Background and content 
Shock of Daylight was recorded in Studio 3 of Townhouse Studios, except for "Winter", which was recorded at Elephant Studio in London and a studio only referred to as "Crow".

Sounds described the album's style as "If All Fall Down chipped away at the gothic walls of From the Lions Mouth, Shock of Daylight nails down the carpet, but nervously pulls open the curtains".

Release 
Shock of Daylight was released in April 1984 by record label Statik in the UK and A & M Records in the US.

"Counting the Days" was released as a single in the UK. "Golden Soldiers" was released as a single in the same year in Spain only.

Reception 

Shock of Daylight has been well received by critics. The Big Takeover described it as "a triumphant comeback for [the Sound], a nice return from the interesting but obviously non-commercial All Fall Down, an LP whose lack of salibility effectively got 'em booted from Korova/Warners, and this first release on Static [sic] is a reminder of why they're such a great band". Melody Maker described the EP as "probably the most fearlessly outgoing music the Sound have produced since Jeopardy".

Track listing

Personnel 
 The Sound

 Adrian Borland – vocals, guitar, keyboards
 Colvin "Max" Mayers – keyboards, guitar
 Graham Bailey – bass guitar
 Michael Dudley – drums, percussion

 Additional personnel

 Sarah Smith – brass, brass arrangement
 Tim Smith – brass, brass arrangement
 Alan Douglas – engineering
 Pat Collier – production
 Mike Bigwood – tape operator
 Nick Robbins – drums and bass guitar on "Winter"
 Graham Simmonds – guitar and vocals on "Winter"

References

External links 

 

1984 EPs
The Sound (band) albums
Post-punk EPs